Pan Liangshi (born October 1956) is a lieutenant general of the Chinese People's Liberation Army (PLA). He served as commander of the Beijing Garrison from 2013 to 2016.

Biography
Pan Liangshi was born in October 1956 in Qinghe County, Hebei Province. He enlisted in the PLA in December 1972, and joined the Communist Party of China in December 1974. He graduated from the PLA Artillery Academy, and has a master's degree from the PLA National Defence University.

Pan served as a brigade commander and chief of staff of the 40th Group Army. He became chief of staff of the 39th Group Army in September 2007, and commander of the 39th Army in January 2008. In December 2013, he was appointed commander of the strategically important Beijing Garrison. He replaced Lieutenant General Zheng Chuanfu, who had been promoted to deputy commander of the Beijing Military Region. He became a member of the Beijing Party Standing Committee in February 2015.

Pan attained the rank of lieutenant general (zhong jiang) in July 2015. He was an alternate member of the 18th Central Committee of the Communist Party of China.

References

1956 births
Living people
People's Liberation Army generals from Hebei
People from Xingtai
PLA National Defence University alumni
Alternate members of the 18th Central Committee of the Chinese Communist Party